Żoliborz  is one of the northern districts of the city of Warsaw. It is located directly to the north of the City Centre, on the left bank of the Vistula river. It has approximately 50,000 inhabitants and is one of the smallest boroughs of Warsaw. Despite its small size, the district has many green areas and mostly consists of low-rise architecture. Historically an upscale neighborhood and home to Warsaw's intelligentsia prior to World War II, Żoliborz is the second most expensive residential district in Warsaw after Śródmieście.

History 
In the 18th century the area belonged to the Piarists of a monastery in the nearby city of Warsaw. The monks started to parcel the grounds and allowed for the creation of various settlements on their fields, which were parceled between several villages. One of them was named Joli Bord (Beautiful Embankment in French, which was later transcribed to Polish language as Żoliborz). After 1831 the area was confiscated by Russian authorities, who erected the Warsaw Citadel there.  The area was mostly unpopulated and even after the ban on construction of brick-made houses was lifted, it retained much of its rural character.

After Poland regained its independence in 1918, the city of Warsaw started to grow rapidly and new areas were needed. In the 1920s the area of Żoliborz was converted into a borough of Warsaw and the construction of new houses started. Until the late 1930s part of today's Żoliborz was built-up with houses notable for their modernist architecture. Open areas, parks and squares built there are regarded as fine examples of good urbanist architecture. Also, a so-called Żoliborz Oficerski (Officers' Żoliborz) was built up with villas for the officers of the Polish Army and other notable people of the epoch. Several star-shaped squares were built along the main axis of the borough, with the Plac Wilsona as the borough's centre and main transport hub.

During the Warsaw Uprising one of the first struggles took part in Żoliborz. After the Polish soldiers were defeated by the Germans, Żoliborz was spared the fate of the rest of Warsaw and survived the war to a higher degree than other areas.

The district has traditionally been where the intelligentsia live. The names of its estates: Żoliborz Dziennikarski (Journalists’ Żoliborz), Żoliborz Oficerski (Officers' Żoliborz), Żoliborz Urzędniczy (Clerks’ Żoliborz) are derived from the former inhabitants professions.

Żoliborz has a lot of beautiful architecture: charming old villas and colonies - properties built in the 1930s by the socialist Warsaw Housing Cooperative (WSM), which used to have common laundries, kindergartens and dining-rooms.

The main site of interest in Żoliborz is St. Stanislaus Kostka Church with the tomb of blessed Jerzy Popiełuszko, which during the last 30 years has been visited by approximately 20,000,000 people (among them John Paul II).

Neighbourhoods within the district 
 Marymont-Potok
 Sady Żoliborskie
 Stary Żoliborz

Famous people born in Żoliborz
Elisabeth Jerichau-Baumann
Jarosław Kaczyński
Lech Kaczyński

Historical and Notable Sights 

thumb|Tomb of blessed Jerzy Popiełuszko
 Churches and temples:
Monastery and School of Sisters of the Resurrection
 Church of Lady Queen of Poland
St. Stanislaus Kostka Church
 Infant Jesus Church
 St. John Cantius Church
 Cemeteries:
Powązki Military Cemetery
 Monuments:
Polish 1st Armoured Division Monument at Inwalidów Square
 Haller's 'Blue Army' Monument at Grunwald Square
 Monument to AK soldiers fallen in the attack on Gdańsk Station
 Monument to the Volhynia 27th Home Army Infantry Division
 Priest Jerzy Popiełuszo Monument at Krasińskiego Street (corner of ks. J. Popiełuszki Street)
 Stele commemorating Priest Roman Indrzejczyk at Inwalidów Square
 Witold Pilecki Monument at al. Wojska Polskiego
Memorials
 Memorial stone devoted to Jacek Kuroń in Stefan Żeromski Park
 Plaque at Wybrzeże Gdyńskie Street commemorating soldiers 2nd Warsaw Infantry Division First Polish Army fallen during fighting for bridgeheads during Warsaw Uprising
 The monument of the Sub-district II of Żoliborz „Żywiciela”  at ks. J. Popiełuszki Street
 Mural at Marii Kazimiery Street commemorating David Bowie visiting Żoliborz. British artist stayed in Warsaw in 1976 during a trip from Zurich to Moscow. Unnoticed by the crowd, he bought at Wilson Square (then Plac Komuny Square) a vinyl record of Śląsk Song and Dance Ensemble. That was an inspiration for the song "Warszawa" from his "Low" album. Mural was created after the death of the musician to commemorate the 40th anniversary of the visit.
 Others
Warsaw Citadel
X Pawilonu Museum
 Sokolnicki's Fort
Museum of Sport and Tourism

Culture

 Biblioteka Publiczna w Dzielnicy Żoliborz m.st. Warszawy (local library)
 Komedia Theatre
 Wisła Cinema
 Trzyrzecze Theatre

References

External links